North Myrtle Beach High School is a public school located in Little River, South Carolina.  The school is one of nine high schools within Horry County Schools.  The school serves the city of North Myrtle Beach, the town of Atlantic Beach, and the communities of Little River and Longs.

History
Following integration, North Myrtle Beach High School was created out of Wampee-Little River High School (the white school) and Chestnut High School (the black school).  These two schools covered an attendance zone including Atlantic Beach, Little River, Longs, and the newly incorporated North Myrtle Beach.  The school mascot, the "Chiefs", and the school colors were voted on by a committee consisting of one member from each of the six grades of the original two schools.  The previous mascots were the "Indians" (Wampee), and the "Braves" (Chestnut).  The school's colors of blue and gold are a combination of Wampee High School's blue and white, and Chestnut High School's maroon and gold.

Sports

North Myrtle Beach High School offers the following sports: baseball, basketball, cheerleading, cross country, football, golf, lacrosse, soccer, softball, swimming, tennis, track and field, volleyball, and wrestling.

The school's teams compete in South Carolina Region 6-4A sports with Myrtle Beach High School, Marlboro County High School, Hartsville High School, Darlington High School, and Wilson High School.

The school's won the region football championship in 2006, 2016, 2017, and 2020 The 2017 team had the best record in school history with a 12–1 season.

The school’s volleyball team won the SCHSL State Championship in 2012, 2018, & 2019 and were the state runner-ups in 2013.

Notable alumni

Kelly Tilghman – Is a broadcaster for The Golf Channel, and the PGA Tour's first female lead golf announcer.
Vanna White – Television personality known for co-hosting Wheel of Fortune. (Class of 1975)
Ryan Quigley – Played at Boston College and is a retired NFL punter. He was formerly signed with the Chicago Bears, New York Jets, Arizona Cardinals, New England Patriots, and the Minnesota Vikings. Quigley was the first North Myrtle Beach football player to reach the NFL in school history. (Class of 2008)
Temarrick Hemingway – Hemingway, who played at South Carolina State, was the 2nd player in school history to reach the NFL. He is now a free agent tight end. He was formerly signed with the Los Angeles Rams, Washington Football Team, Carolina Panthers, and the Denver Broncos. (Class of 2011)

References

External links
 North Myrtle Beach High School official site
 North Myrtle Beach HS Athletics

Public high schools in South Carolina
Schools in Horry County, South Carolina